Sphingomonas flava  is a Gram-negative, strictly aerobic, rod-shaped and non-motile bacteria from the genus of Sphingomonas which has been isolated from soil from Yongin-si from the Gyeonggi Province in Korea.

References

Further reading 
 

flava
Bacteria described in 2015